Michel Beaune (1933–1990) was a French actor.

Filmography

1960: Trapped by Fear - Un ami de Paul (uncredited)
1961: Les godelureaux
1964: Backfire - Daniel
1970: The Confession - L'avocat
1970: The Time to Die - Castagnac
1970: Sortie de secours
1972: Paulina 1880 - Dadi
1972: Plot
1972: Les Rois maudits (TV Mini-Series) -  Edward II of England
1973: The Inheritor - Frédéric Lambert
1974: Stavisky - Le journaliste maître-chanteur
1975: Un jour, la fête
1975: Let Joy Reign Supreme - Le capitaine La Griollais
1975: Incorrigible - Le ministre
1975: Le faux-cul - Ferjac
1975: The French Detective - L'inspecteur Dupuy
1976: Body of My Enemy - L'ami d'enfance
1977: La question - Professeur Fayard
1978: Get Out Your Handkerchiefs - Le médecin dans la rue
1979: Cop or Hood - Marcel Langlois
1979: Le mors aux dents - Froment
1979: Courage - Let's Run - Noël
1980: Le Guignolo - Louis Fréchet
1981: Julien Fontanes, magistrat (TV Series) - Bonsmoulins
1981: Birgit Haas Must Be Killed - Delaunay
1981: Dickie-roi (TV Mini-Series) - M. Hollmann
1981: The Professional - Le capitaine Valeras
1981: Coup de Torchon - Vanderbrouck - un nouveau riche arrogant
1983: Le Battant - Pierre Mignot
1983: Tout le monde peut se tromper - Le notaire
1983: L'indic - Le comissaire Legoff
1984: Mesrine - Le commissaire Devos
1984: Les Morfalous - Le général français (uncredited)
1984: Happy Easter - Rousseau
1984: Asphalt Warriors - Rigault
1985: Le cowboy - Le commissaire
1985: Honeymoon - Maître Garnier
1987: Le Solitaire - Le commissaire Pezzoli
1987: Itinerary of a Spoiled Child - Notaire de Sam
1990: Feu sur le candidat - Le ministre / Secretary of the Interior

External links

1933 births
1990 deaths
Deaths from cancer in France
French male film actors
French male television actors
French National Academy of Dramatic Arts alumni
20th-century French male actors